Julien Perrin (born March 19, 1985 in Lyon) is a French professional footballer. He last played for Villefranche FC in French fourth tier in the 2016/2017 season.

Perrin played one match at the professional level in Ligue 1 for AS Saint-Étienne.

References

External links
 

1985 births
Living people
French footballers
Ligue 1 players
Championnat National 2 players
Racing Besançon players
AS Saint-Étienne players
AS Cannes players
Thonon Evian Grand Genève F.C. players
Association football forwards